Metipocregyes nodieri is a species of beetle in the family Cerambycidae. It was described by Maurice Pic in 1933, originally under the genus Mesosa. It is known from Vietnam.

References

Mesosini
Beetles described in 1933